Ben 10: Ultimate Alien is an American animated television series, the third entry in Cartoon Network's Ben 10 franchise created by team Man of Action. It is produced by Cartoon Network Studios and Distributed By Warner Bros. Domestic Television. It was slated to premiere after the series finale of Ben 10: Alien Force on March 26, 2010, but instead premiered on April 23, 2010 on Cartoon Network in the US. In India and Latin America, it premiered on October 10, 2010. In Canada, the series started airing on September 12, 2010, on Teletoon.

The series finale aired on March 31, 2012 with the two-part episode "The Ultimate Enemy" dedicated to the memory of series developer, writer, and producer Dwayne McDuffie, who died during the production of the series.

Plot
Ben 10: Ultimate Alien takes place a few weeks after the events of the previous series. With the Omnitrix having been destroyed in the series finale of Alien Force, Ben Tennyson, now sixteen years old, must learn to master the powers of the Ultimatrix, a modified version of the Omnitrix which has the ability to evolve Ben's alien forms into much more powerful versions known as "ultimate forms." The series begins with the exposure of Ben's secret identity to the world by J. Jonah "Jimmy" Jones, a young internet conspiracy theorist who deduces his identity by studying alien sightings in Ben's hometown of Bellwood. Ben's exposure polarizes public opinion, with younger fans idolizing him, and adults (particularly news anchor Will Harangue) deriding Ben as a menace to society. Ben is now forced to adjust to a new life that not only involves battling the forces of evil alongside his cousin Gwen Tennyson and his best friend Kevin Levin, but also his struggle against the pitfalls of his new-found fame.

The first season of Ultimate Alien revolves around an Osmosian villain named Aggregor, who kidnaps five powerful aliens from the Andromeda Galaxy in order to steal their powers. Although Ben and his team try to stop Aggregor, he succeeds in absorbing the aliens into himself, becoming virtually unstoppable. Ben then learns from Azmuth, the creator of the Omnitrix and Ultimatrix, that Aggregor's goal is to find the scattered pieces of the Map of Infinity, a map of spacetime which can lead him to a realm known as the Forge of Creation. Aggregor intends to enter the Forge of Creation and steal the powers of an infant Celestialsapien, a species of omnipotent, godlike aliens which can manipulate reality and time to an essentially unlimited extent with their thoughts.

Aggregor manages to reach the Forge of Creation and the team pursues him. They are nearly defeated by Aggregor, but Kevin, as a last resort, absorbs the powers of the Ultimatrix and is able to defeat Aggregor, absorbing his powers in the process. Unfortunately, the absorption of too much power overwhelms Kevin, leading him to insanity and an unquenchable thirst for more power. This leads to a stand-off between him and Ben, who, after failed attempts at tracking and saving Kevin, resolves to kill Kevin to prevent him from hurting anyone. But with the aid of Gwen, he is able to instead remove Kevin's absorbed powers, saving him and restoring the five aliens from the Andromeda Galaxy back to life.

The second season features primarily self-contained stories, including an episode in which Ben's ultimate forms achieve sentience and attempt to free themselves from within the Ultimatrix by trapping Ben within it. Ben decides to sacrifice himself so that the ultimates can be free; instead, the Ultimatrix recognizes his selflessness and frees both him and the ultimates.

Both the second and third seasons of Ultimate Alien primarily focus on the Forever Knights, and particularly their leader and founder, Sir George, an immortal soldier and the origin of the myth of Saint George and the Dragon. George seeks to prevent the threat of Dagon, an extradimensional energy being which he defeated in the 12th century, which now seeks to return to Earth and take over the minds of all humans. George is killed, but Dagon himself is absorbed by Ben's nemesis Vilgax. Ben defeats Vilgax by using George's sword, a weapon built by Azmuth that is powerful enough to destroy planets, to absorb Vilgax's power into itself.

Though tempted by the sword's power to wipe out all evil with a mere thought, Ben overcomes the temptation and returns it to Azmuth. Azmuth, impressed by Ben's exercise of self-control in the face of such strong temptation, tells Ben to give up the Ultimatrix and rewards him with a new Omnitrix which he says he has been working on since Ben got hold of the first Omnitrix in the original series. He then departs, telling Ben to use the Omnitrix well and do the right thing.

Episodes

Characters

Crossovers

Merchandise and other media

Video games

Just like every other iteration of the Ben 10 series, Ultimate Alien received a video game based on its premise. The game was available on the 360, PS2, DS, PSP, Wii, and PS3.

Ben 10 Galactic Racing is available on the 360, DS, 3DS, Wii, and PS3.

Toys
Ben 10: Ultimate Alien toys were made by Bandai. They were first shown at the New York Toy Fair 2010. The first wave of the toy franchise was released in different places in America in spring 2010. The toys were released in Canada and the United Kingdom in the fall of 2010. McDonald's was also selling six Ben 10: Ultimate Alien toys to promote the show.

References

External links

 Official CN US website

2010s American animated television series
2010s American science fiction television series
2010 American television series debuts
2012 American television series endings
American children's animated action television series
American children's animated drama television series
American children's animated science fantasy television series
American children's animated superhero television series
Ultimate Alien
English-language television shows
Cartoon Network Studios superheroes
Cartoon Network original programming
Television series by Cartoon Network Studios
American sequel television series
Works by Len Wein
Anime-influenced Western animated television series
Teen animated television series
Teen superhero television series
Television series about shapeshifting
Television series set on fictional planets